Pierre Bilger (May 27, 1940 – March 4, 2011) was a French high-ranking civil servant and businessman. He was a tax inspector and advisor to several ministers. He served as the chief executive officer of Alstom from 1991 to 2003.

Early life
Pierre Bilger was born on May 27, 1940, in Colmar, France. His father, Joseph Bilger, was an agrarian politician who received a ten-year jail sentence after World War II for collaborating with Nazi Germany. Bilger grew up in Montargis with his mother, his two brothers (economist François Bilger and prosecutor Philippe Bilger), and his sister.

Bilger was educated at the Collège Saint-Louis, a Roman Catholic school in Montargis. He graduated from Sciences Po and the École nationale d'administration.

Career
Bilger served as a tax inspector and he authored a report on the monthly payment of the income tax (as opposed to annually). His report subsequently led to a new law passed by parliament. Meanwhile, Bilger worked for Treasury Minister Jean-Pierre Fourcade, Labour Ministers Michel Durafour and Robert Boulin, and Budget Minister Maurice Papon.

Bilger joined Alstom in 1987. He served as its chief executive officer from 1991 to 2003. During his tenure, two of its shareholders, General Electric Company plc and Alcatel, divested from Alstom. Meanwhile, Bilger spearheaded its international expansion. Upon his retirement in 2003, he turned down a 4.1 million Euro golden parachute because Alstom was experiencing difficulties.

Bilger served on the boards of directors of Société Générale, Thales Group and Eurotunnel.

Bilger was the author of two books. He became an Officer of the Legion of Honour and a Commander of the National Order of Merit.

Personal life and death
Bilger was married, and had 5 children.

Bilger died of leukemia on March 4, 2011, in Paris. He was 70 years old.

Works

References

1940 births
2011 deaths
People from Colmar
Sciences Po alumni
École nationale d'administration alumni
Inspection générale des finances (France)
French chief executives
French corporate directors
Officiers of the Légion d'honneur
Commanders of the Ordre national du Mérite
Deaths from leukemia
Deaths from cancer in France
French energy industry businesspeople